Cape Egede is a headland in southwest Greenland in the Kujalleq municipality near the modern settlement of Nanortalik. It is named after Danish-Norwegian missionary Hans Egede.

Geography
The cape is located at the southern end of Sermersooq Island (Sermersok) off the western coast of Nanortalik Island roughly between Cape Thordvaldsen and Cape Farewell. The Kitsissut Islands lie offshore to the south of the cape.

References

Headlands of Greenland

sv:Kap Egede